Jobable (formerly Hiring Screen) is a Hong Kong based jobs board and career platform that lists candidate job applications for employers, and job opportunities for job seekers, in order of their suitability using algorithms and big data.

History

Jobable was founded in March 2014 and is founded and led by CEO Richard Hanson and CPO Luke Byrne.

In September 2015 Jobable secured funding of US$800,000.

In May 2016 Jobable launched relevance scoring platform for jobs in Hong Kong.

References

External links
 Disrupting Hong Kong's Recruitment Industry
Employment websites
Business services companies established in 2014
Service companies of Hong Kong
Hong Kong websites